The Punjab Stadium is a football stadium in Lahore, Pakistan. It was nicknamed the "Ian Rush Stadium" after the Liverpool striker visited Pakistan to promote grassroots football in the country.  Muhammad Essa was the first man to score an international goal at this venue. Real Lahore, WAPDA FC and Wohaib FC use the venue for association football matches.

Construction 
The Punjab Stadium was built in 2003 at a cost of $220 million. The stadium has a capacity of 15,000 spectators. It was designed by architect Khalil-ur-Rehman & Associates, and is also used for athletics, kabaddi, rugby league and rugby union.

Matches
In 2006, the stadium hosted Pakistan's Asian Cup qualifier against Jordan. Next year, it hosted 13 of the 15 matches of the AFC President's Cup. In October 2007, it hosted the first leg of Pakistan's WC qualifier against Iraq national football team.

It hosted a few matches of the Super League (Club) phase of the 2010 PFF League. Later that year, it hosted the DFA Lahore League.

On 1 March 2011, the stadium hosted a Pakistan vs. Palestine friendly match, which the hosts lost 2-1 Eight days later, it hosted the second leg of Pakistan's Olympic football Asian qualifying tournament against Malaysia, which ended 0-0. 7,000 spectators attended the match. Four months later, on July 3, it hosted the second leg of Pakistan's World Cup qualifier against Bangladesh, which ended goalless. The same year, it was one of the hosts of the National U-19 Football Championship 2011.

In May 2012, it hosted all Group A fixtures of the 2012 AFC President's Cup, with Mongolian club Erchim and Taiwan Power Company F.C. facing off against each other and 2011 Pakistan Premier League champions Khan Research Laboratories F.C. The same month, it hosted the semifinals and final of the Zong United Kick-off Football Tournament 2012. As part of the Punjab International Sports Festival, the stadium hosted the Chief Minister Punjab International Football Cup 2012 in November, which was won by Serbian club FK Bor. The tournament also featured Shaab Ibb SCC (Yemen), Erchim (Mongolia), Red Sun SC (Sri Lanka), Punjab Greens, and Punjab Whites.

On October 12, 2014, it hosted a friendly against Palestine, which Pakistan lost 2-0. A few months later, on February 6, 2015, it hosted another friendly against Afghanistan, which Pakistan won 2-1.

It has also hosted the semifinals, third place playoff, and the final of the 2016 PFF Cup.

In 2018, the stadium hosted the 11th edition of the National Women Football Championship. It was also one of the venues of the 2018 Pakistan Premier League season.

In 2020, it hosted the club leg of the 12th edition of the second-division PFF League. Later that year, it hosted majority of the matches of the 2020 PFF National Challenge Cup, the domestic knockout football tournament of Pakistan.

See also
 List of stadiums in Pakistan
 List of sports venues in Lahore

References

Sports venues in Lahore
Athletics (track and field) venues in Pakistan
Football venues in Pakistan
Pakistan
Stadiums in Pakistan
2003 establishments in Pakistan